Peng Hsien-yin (born 22 December 1989) is a Taiwanese professional tennis player and competes mainly on the ATP Challenger Tour and ITF Futures, both in singles and doubles.

Peng reached his highest ATP singles ranking, No. 956 on 9 July 2012, and his highest ATP doubles ranking, No. 99, on 20 April 2015.

Career to date, Peng has reacher 45 doubles finals all on the ATP Challenger and ITF Futures tours. Of those he has a final record of 21 wins and 24 losses.

He competes for his native country of Taiwan in Davis Cup play. In singles matches, he has a record of 0 wins and 2 losses. In doubles matches, he has a record of 3 wins and 5 losses.

In 2017 at the 2017 Wimbledon Championships partnering Sander Arends of the Netherlands, Peng won his first-round qualifying match and even though he lost in the second and final qualifying round, was granted a lucky loser spot to successfully reach his first (and to date, his only) career Grand Slam main draw in men's doubles. In a rare twist of fate, their first round opponents were the same ones they lost to in qualifying, Swedish duo Johan Brunström and Andreas Siljeström. This time the match was a back-and-forth tight five set thriller that span several hours, and ended with a 22-game 5th set. They were unfortunately on the losing end of a 7–6(7–4), 1–6, 6–4, 6–7(4–7), 10–12 score sheet.

In 2018, Peng attempted to qualify again the following year at the 2018 Wimbledon Championships partnering Aliaksandr Bury of Belarus, however they were defeated in the first round by Ariel Behar and Hsieh Cheng-peng 3–6, 6–4, 4–6.

Other than the 3 wins he has amounted from Davis Cup matches, the only other win Peng has achieved at the ATP Tour level was at the 2015 Open Sud de France held on hard courts in Montpellier. Partnering Mao-Xin Gong of China, they defeated the pairing of Alexander Zverev and Laurent Lokoli 6–4, 7–6(7–4) in the first round before losing in the second round quite handily to doubles specialists Rameez Junaid and Adil Shamasdin 1–6, 1–6.

ATP Challenger & ITF Futures finals

Doubles: 45 (21–24)

References

External links
 
 

1989 births
Living people
Taiwanese male tennis players
People from Hsinchu
Tennis players at the 2014 Asian Games
Tennis players at the 2018 Asian Games
Asian Games medalists in tennis
Asian Games silver medalists for Chinese Taipei
Medalists at the 2014 Asian Games
Universiade medalists in tennis
Universiade gold medalists for Chinese Taipei
Universiade silver medalists for Chinese Taipei
Universiade bronze medalists for Chinese Taipei
Medalists at the 2013 Summer Universiade
Medalists at the 2015 Summer Universiade
Medalists at the 2017 Summer Universiade